Omar is an unincorporated community in Sussex County, Delaware, United States, located at the crossroads of Delaware Route 20 (Armory Road/Pyle Center Road) and Sussex County Road 54 (Omar Road) and between the towns of Dagsboro and Roxana.

Omar was a post village.

The Baltimore Mills Historic Archaeological Site was added to the National Register of Historic Places in 1997.

References

Unincorporated communities in Sussex County, Delaware
Unincorporated communities in Delaware